Vassilis Steriadis (1947–2003) was a Greek poet and critic. He studied Law at the University of Athens and Italian at the Universita per Stranieri in Perugia, Italy. He worked as a lawyer until 2002.

From 1969 on, he collaborated with many literary periodicals (Lotos, Hroniko etc.), and from 1976 to 1984 he was writing critical articles and book reviews for the newspaper Kathimerini. He coined the literary term Genia tou 70, which refers to Greek authors who began publishing their work during the 1970s, especially towards the end of the Greek military junta of 1967-1974 and at the first years of the Metapolitefsi.

Works

Poetry
Ο κ. Ιβο (Mr Ivo), 1970
Το ιδιωτικό αεροπλάνο (The Personal Airplane), 1971
Ντικ ο χλομός (Pale Dick), 1976
Το χαμένο κολλιέ (The Lost Necklace), 1983
Ο προπονητής παίκτης (The Trainer Player), 1992
Χριστούγεννα της Ισοπαλίας (Equalizing Christmas), 2002

Prose
Η κατηγορία Α1 (Category A1), novel, 1979

External links
His page at the website of the Hellenic Authors' Society (Greek) and (English)
His books at Kedros publishers

1947 births
2003 deaths
Writers from Volos
21st-century Greek poets
20th-century Greek poets
National and Kapodistrian University of Athens alumni
Greek male poets
20th-century Greek male writers
21st-century Greek male writers
People from Volos